Pino Roveredo (16 October 1954 – 21 January 2023) was an Italian writer and theatre director.

Works

Novels and essays
Capriole in salita (1996)
Una risata piena di finestre (1997)
La città dei cancelli (1998)
La bela vita (1998)
Ballando con Cecilia (2000)
Centro diurno/Le fa male qui? (2000)
San Martino al Campo - Trent'anni (2000)
Schizzi di vino in brodo (2001)
Cara Trieste (2004)
Mandami a dire (2005)
Andar per fodere/Un giro tra le pieghe di Trieste (2006)
Caracreatura (2007)
Vis-à-vis (2007)
Attenti alle rose (2009)
La melodia del corvo (2010)
Mio padre votava Berlinguer (2012)
La rielaborazione di Ballando con Cecilia (2013)
Mastica e sputa (2016)

Theatre director
La bela vita
Centro diurno
Le fa male qui?
Sarà il paradiso...
L'ultima corsa
Mercoledì
Ballando con cecilia
Le chiavi di Melara
Volevo tanto dirti che..
Cari estinti
La pankina 
Capriole in salita
Caracreatura
Succo d'aceto
D...come Donna
La melodia del corvo
La legge è uguale per tutti?
Quarto binario

References

1954 births
2023 deaths
20th-century Italian writers
21st-century Italian writers
Italian theatre directors
Writers from Trieste